Casa Sommer is a building in Cascais, on the Portuguese Riviera, which houses the Cascais Municipal Historical Archive and a branch of the Cascais Municipal Library, hosting collections pertaining to the town's archaeological, architectural, historical and cultural heritage. Built as the residence of entrepreneur Henrique de Sommer, Casa Sommer is a noted example of Summer architecture.

History
The house was constructed at the end of the 19th century. It is considered the most important example of a neoclassical private residence in Cascais. The exterior features smooth and curved pediments, fluted pilasters, and triglyphs. The main façade features a rectangular portico, which frames the entrance and creates the balcony on the second floor, which is protected by a balustrade.

After it ceased to be a family home the house was for a time used as a language school and then a children's home, before falling into disrepair for a time. It was then restored by the Municipality of Cascais and officially opened on 7 December 2016. The work, led by the architect Paula Santos, which also included the building's old coach house, succeeded in adding considerable internal floor space. It included construction of a new underground corridor linking the main building to the coach house, which now houses the Municipal Historical Archive.

Collection
On display is the restored Foral of Cascais, which was a royal document signed by Manuel I of Portugal whose purpose was to establish a town or village Council and regulate its administration, borders and privileges. A community would need a Foral in order to function as a town. The second oldest book is the Livro de Posturas (Book of Regulations), which recorded the town's rules and regulations.

References

External links

Buildings and structures in Cascais
Art museums and galleries in Portugal
Museums in Lisbon District
Summer architecture